Gianni Agus (17 August 1917 – 4 March 1994) was an Italian actor with a career in film, television, and theatre since 1938. He appeared in more than 60 films between 1938 and 1991.

Life and career
Born in Cagliari, Sardinia, after his diploma in accounting Agus moved to Rome to enrol in the Centro Sperimentale di Cinematografia, from which he graduated in 1938. The same year he made his screen debut in Carmine Gallone's The Life of Giuseppe Verdi and his stage debut with the Merlini-Cialente company. 

Agus' career took off in the post-war period, with his participation in numerous revues and musical comedies, often working with Wanda Osiris. His popularity in the general public increased thanks to the television, particularly with the hosting of the eight edition of the Sanremo Music Festival, and later as the sidekick of comedians Peppino De Filippo and Paolo Villaggio on several TV-shows.

Partial filmography

 The Life of Giuseppe Verdi (1938)
 Inventiamo l'amore (1938) - Un invitato alla festa
 The Sons of the Marquis Lucera (1939)
 Naples Will Never Die (1939) - Bebè
 Io, suo padre (1939)
 His Young Wife (1945) - Velan
 Adam and Eve (1949) - Paride
 Femmina incatenata (1949) - Gianni
 Figaro Here, Figaro There (1950) - Il conte di Almaviva
 The Enchanting Enemy (1953)
 Funniest Show on Earth (1953) - Il signore dai capelli tinti di rosso (uncredited)
 Ci troviamo in galleria (1953) - Il lettore di pubblicità
 Verdi (1953) - (uncredited)
 It Takes Two to Sin in Love (1954)
 Cardinal Lambertini (1954) - Count Pepoli
 Giove in doppiopetto (1954)
 Susanna Whipped Cream (1957) - Trombetti
 Femmine tre volte (1957) - Marchese De Blasi
 La cento chilometri (1959) - Corsetti's Friend with a Bow Tie
 The Fascist (1961) - Capo del fascio di Cremona
 Pesci d'oro e bikini d'argento (1961)
 The Two Marshals (1961) - Podestà Pennica
 2 samurai per 100 geishe (1962) - Avv. Sciabica
 I motorizzati (1962) - Mario
 Sexy Toto (1963) - Ispettore di dogana
 Uno strano tipo (1963) - Gastone
 Toto vs. the Four (1963) - Dottor Cavallo (uncredited)
 Divorzio alla siciliana (1963) - L'avvocato
 Le motorizzate (1963) - The Prosecutor (segment "Il Vigile Ignoto")
 Toto and Cleopatra (1963) - Ottavio
 Europa: Operazione Strip-tease (1964)
 L'immorale (1980) - Un presentatore televisivo
 The Long, the Short, the Cat (1967) - Il conte
 Soldati e capelloni (1967) - Colonello Ortega
 Peggio per me... meglio per te (1967) - Barone Marcianò
 The Most Beautiful Couple in the World (1968) - Gianni
 La vuole lui... lo vuole lei (1968)
 Franco e Ciccio... Ladro e Guardia (1969) - Naked man in airport
 Lisa dagli occhi blu (1970) - Centro Spaziale Engineer
 Il gatto di Brooklyn aspirante detective (1973) - Aldemiro Arcangelo Gabriele De Porcaris
 Ku-Fu? Dalla Sicilia con furore (1973) - Kon Ki Lay
 Dirty Weekend (1973) - Sergio
 4 marmittoni alle grandi manovre (1974) - Il colonnello
 Il colonnello Buttiglione diventa generale (1974) - Generale La Tanica
 Il trafficone (1974) - on. Rivolta
 The Balloon Vendor (1974) - Circus Manager
 Buttiglione diventa capo del servizio segreto (1975) - Generale La Tanica
 Due sul pianerottolo (1976) - Dott. Gianni Tagliolini
 My Sister in Law (1976) - Angelo Scotti
 Orazi e curiazi 3-2 (1977) - Mezio
 Fracchia la belva umana (1981) - Dott. Orimbelli
 Culo e camicia (1981) - Annibale Panebianco
 I carabbimatti (1981) - Giuseppe Marrone
 Camera d'albergo (1981) - Himself
 Sbirulino (1982) - Brescioni
 Cuando calienta el sol... vamos a la playa (1982)
 Questo e Quello (1983) - Editor (segment "Questo... amore impossibile")
 Matilda (1990) - Matilda's Father

References

External links

1917 births
1994 deaths
Italian male film actors
20th-century Italian male actors
Italian male stage actors
Italian male television actors
Italian television presenters
Centro Sperimentale di Cinematografia alumni